Thompson Pump and Manufacturing is a privately held pump manufacturer in Port Orange, Florida.  It manufactures engine-powered pumps for construction, bypass, dewatering, wastewater, sewage, mining, petroleum, municipal, agriculture, military and industrial markets.

History
The company was founded in 1970  by George A. Thompson and his sons, Bill and George Jr. The company was the first pump manufacturer to adapt a rotary pump to the dewatering industry. It manufactures all of its pumps in-house and manages sales, rentals and service through domestic and international field offices, as well as a network of third party distributors. George Jr. died in 1979 at age 25, and George Sr. retired in 1999.

Products
Thompson Pump & Manufacturing's primary products are wet prime trash pumps, dry prime trash pumps with compressor-assisted or vacuum-assisted priming systems, sound attenuated trash pumps, hydraulic power units with submersible pump ends, diaphragm pumps, rotary wellpoint pumps and high pressure jet pumps. Patented, branded products and technologies include:
 Vacuum Underdrain Pipe - improves efficiency in shallow dewatering
 Arctic Knight - diesel driven pump for use down to -40°F
 Enviroprime - prevents sewage, debris and chemical discharge from escaping into environment
 Pumpology School - training program for students, contractors and others covering pump applications and technology

References

External links
 Official Website

Companies based in Volusia County, Florida
Pump manufacturers
Port Orange, Florida
Manufacturing companies based in Florida